Sara Josephine Jacobs (born February 1, 1989) is an American politician serving as the U.S. representative for , previously representing the 53rd congressional district from 2021 to 2023. Her district includes central and eastern portions of San Diego, as well as eastern suburbs such as El Cajon, La Mesa, Spring Valley, and Lemon Grove. A member of the Democratic Party, she is the youngest member of California's congressional delegation.

Early life and education 
Jacobs was born in Del Mar, California, on February 1, 1989, and raised in San Diego. She is the granddaughter of businessman and Qualcomm founder Irwin M. Jacobs, and the daughter of Jerri-Ann and philanthropist Gary E. Jacobs. Her uncle, Paul E. Jacobs, was the former CEO and chairman of Qualcomm. Jacobs graduated from Torrey Pines High School and Columbia University, earning a bachelor's degree in political science in 2011 and a master's degree in international relations in 2012.

Early career 
After earning her master's degree, Jacobs worked for the United Nations and UNICEF. In February 2014, she began working as a contractor to the United States Department of State. During her later Congressional campaign, Jacobs drew attention for falsely claiming to have been a "policymaker" at the State Department. Jacobs did not make policy for the State Department, instead working at a junior level for a contractor, not for the Department itself. She then served as a policy advisor on Hillary Clinton's 2016 presidential campaign. After the election, Jacobs formed a nonprofit called "San Diego for Every Child: The Coalition to End Child Poverty."

U.S. House of Representatives

Elections

2018 

In the blanket primary election, she finished third, behind Diane Harkey and Mike Levin. A Super PAC affiliated with EMILY's List launched a media blitz right before the primary after Jacobs's grandfather donated $250,000 to the organization. This led primary opponents to accuse her of "buying" endorsements.

2020 

She finished first in the top-two primary, and defeated San Diego City Council President Georgette Gómez in the November general election. She became the youngest United States Representative from California when she assumed office on January 3, 2021.

During her political campaigns, Jacobs has received significant funding from her grandfather. According to OpenSecrets, Jacobs was the 5th most self-funded candidate in the 2020 United States elections. She financed $6,921,255 to her campaign, constituting 90.32% of total campaign contributions.

2022 

Following redistricting from the 2020 US Census, Jacobs is running in California's 51st congressional district.

Tenure 
In 2022, Jacobs authored legislation to regulate the collection of personal reproductive health data, as in period-tracking apps. Mazie Hirono and Ron Wyden introduced a version in the U.S. Senate.

Along with 16 other members of Congress, Jacobs was arrested at a demonstration in support of abortion rights outside the United States Supreme Court Building on July 19, 2022.

Committee assignments 

 House Democratic Steering and Policy Committee
Committee on Armed Services
 Subcommittee on Intelligence and Special Operations
 Subcommittee on Seapower and Projection Forces
 Committee on Foreign Affairs
Subcommittee on Africa (Ranking Member, 2023-present)
Subcommittee on Global Health, Global Human Rights, and International Organizations

Caucus memberships 

Congressional Equality Caucus (Vice Chair)
New Democrat Coalition
Congressional LGBTQ+ Equality Caucus
Congressional Progressive Caucus
Medicare for All Caucus

Political positions

Climate change

Jacobs calls climate change "one of the biggest threats facing humanity". She wants a zero-carbon, clean energy economy by 2030.

Democratic Party leadership 
In 2022, Jacobs said she supported Nancy Pelosi remaining Democratic leader.

Health care

Jacobs supports Medicare for All.

COVID-19

Jacobs called the Trump administration's response to COVID-19 "horribly mishandled". She wants to hold businesses and individuals accountable for price gouging related to personal protective equipment and health care supplies during the pandemic.

Immigration

Jacobs supports including a provision to grant citizenship for undocumented immigrants residing in the U.S., and passing the DREAM Act. She supports increasing funding for the immigration-related court system, and reducing backlogs. She supports modernizing border security and improving transit times. She opposes the Trump administration family separation policy, and wants to end funding on privatized detention facilities. Jacobs wants the U.S. to accept at least 95,000 refugees annually and protect individuals with Temporary Protected Status.

Families and children

Jacobs supports the Child Care is Essential Act, which aims to pay child care workers a good wage and helps pay for child care for working families.

Tax reform

Jacobs wishes to repeal the tax cuts for the wealthy in the Tax Cuts and Jobs Act of 2017. She wants "to increase the highest marginal tax rate and ensure capital gains rates match that, close loopholes in our tax code, and make sure everyone, including corporations, pays their fair share".

Syria
In 2023, Jacobs was among 56 Democrats to vote in favor of H.Con.Res. 21, which directed President Joe Biden to remove U.S. troops from Syria within 180 days.

Personal life

Jacobs lives in the Bankers Hill neighborhood of San Diego. She is Jewish. She has been in a relationship with Ammar Campa-Najjar (a former Democratic candidate for a neighboring congressional district) since 2019.

See also
List of Jewish members of the United States Congress
Women in the United States House of Representatives

References

External links

Representative Sara Jacobs official U.S. House website
 Sara Jacobs for Congress campaign website
 

|-

|-

 -->

1989 births
Columbia College (New York) alumni
Female members of the United States House of Representatives
Jacobs family (telecom)
Jewish members of the United States House of Representatives
Living people
Democratic Party members of the United States House of Representatives from California
Politicians from San Diego
School of International and Public Affairs, Columbia University alumni
Women in California politics
Candidates in the 2018 United States elections
21st-century American women
21st-century American Jews
American Jews from California